Kaare Brøckner Barslund (born 23 March 2004) is a Danish professional footballer who plays as a centre-back for the U-19 squad of Danish Superliga club FC Nordsjælland.

Career

Nordsjælland
Barslund is a product of FC Nordsjælland, which he joined from Helsinge Fodbold at the age of 11, and worked his way up through the club's youth ranks. He was called up for his first game for Nordsjælland's first team on 31 August 2022; a Danish Cup game against BK Frem. He got his debut for the club in the same game, as he came on from the bench for the second half of the game to replace Ulrik Yttergård Jenssen. Only 11 days later, on 11 September 2022, Barslund got his debut in the Danish Superliga, as he came on from the bench for the last four minutes against FC Midtjylland.

References

External links

Kaare Barslund at DBU

2004 births
Living people
Danish men's footballers
Association football defenders
Denmark youth international footballers
Danish Superliga players
FC Nordsjælland players